Major General Sir Charles Edward Corkran,  (20 August 1872 – 9 January 1939) was a senior British Army officer who served as Major-General commanding the Brigade of Guards and General Officer Commanding London District from 1928 to 1932.

Military career
Born the son of Colonel Charles Seymour Corkran and educated at Eton College, Corkran was commissioned into the Grenadier Guards in March 1893. He was promoted to lieutenant on 12 May 1897, and served on the Nile Expedition in 1898, including at the Battle of Omdurman. He was appointed adjutant of the 2nd Battalion of his regiment on 22 October 1899, was promoted to captain on 30 November 1899, and left with his regiment for South Africa to serve in the Second Boer War in March 1900. Serving there throughout the war, he was wounded in the action at Biddulphsberg (May 1900), and was mentioned in despatches. For his service in the war, he received a brevet promotion as major in the South African Honours list published on 26 June 1902. Following the end of hostilities in June 1902, Corkran resigned as adjutant of the 2nd battalion on 16 September 1902, but stayed in South Africa as he was the following day appointed Aide-de-camp to Sir Neville Lyttelton, Commander-in-Chief of South Africa.

He also served in the First World War and, as commanding officer of a battalion of the Grenadier Guards, took his men to France in 1914.

After the war he became commanding officer of the Grenadier Guards Regiment and then went on to be commandant of the Senior Officers' School. He was appointed Commandant of the Royal Military College Sandhurst in 1923 and then became Major-General commanding the Brigade of Guards and General Officer Commanding London District in 1928. He retired in 1932.

In retirement he became Serjeant at Arms of the British House of Lords. He died in a shooting accident.

Family
In 1904 he married Winifred Maud Ricardo, daughter of Colonel Horace Ricardo, another commanding officer of the Grenadier Guards. They had one daughter and two sons.

References

|-
 

1872 births
1939 deaths
British Army major generals
People educated at Eton College
Knights Commander of the Royal Victorian Order
Companions of the Order of the Bath
Companions of the Order of St Michael and St George
Grenadier Guards officers
Commandants of Sandhurst
British Army personnel of the Mahdist War
British Army generals of World War I
British Army personnel of the Second Boer War
Serjeants-at-arms of the House of Lords